Kolotilikha is a rural locality (a village) in Sidorovskoye Rural Settlement, Gryazovetsky District, Vologda Oblast, Russia. The population was 26 as of 2002.

Geography 
Kolotilikha is located 46 km east of Gryazovets (the district's administrative centre) by road. Mukhino is the nearest rural locality.

References 

Rural localities in Gryazovetsky District